Eben am Achensee is a municipality in the Schwaz district in the Austrian state of Tyrol.

Geography
Eben lies in the Achen valley on the shores of the Achensee above the lower Inn valley.

Ortschaften: Bächental | Hinterriß | Maurach | Pertisau
Dörfer: Maurach · Pertisau
Rotten: Buchau · Hinterriß · Eben am Achensee · Rofangarten
Siedlungen: Lärchenwiese | Zerstreute Häuser: Bächental
Sonstige Ortslage: Erfurter Hütte · Gramaialm-Hochleger · Herzog-von-Coburg-Gotha-Jagdschloss · Herzoglicher Alpenhof · Plumsjochhütte · Prälatenhaus · Rotwandlhütte · Steinölbrennerei · Tölzer Hütte

References

Cities and towns in Schwaz District